Andrea Marrazzi (2 October 1887 – 18 October 1972) was an Italian fencer. He won a gold medal in the team épée event at the 1920 Summer Olympics.

References

External links 
 
 

1887 births
1972 deaths
Italian male fencers
Olympic fencers of Italy
Fencers at the 1920 Summer Olympics
Olympic gold medalists for Italy
Olympic medalists in fencing
Sportspeople from Livorno
Medalists at the 1920 Summer Olympics